Claythorpe is a hamlet about  north-west from the town of Alford, Lincolnshire, England, most notable for its water mill. The population is now included in the civil parish of Authorpe.

Claythorpe Mill was for a time a restaurant but is now a visitor attraction with wildfowl gardens, animals and a cafe. It was known previously as Empire Mills when it was built as a corn mill in the 18th century. It was largely rebuilt in the 19th century, and the top floor was destroyed by fire and rebuilt again in 1890. Originally powered by a water wheel it has worked using a turbine since 1890, which is housed at the rear of the building. The steel wheel and gearing are still there, and it is a Grade II listed building. It was the last regularly working water mill in Lincolnshire, although it has not been in use since 1977.

Claythorpe Manor (formerly Claythorpe Hall) is a Grade II listed red brick farmhouse dating from the 18th century.

References

External links

Villages in Lincolnshire
East Lindsey District
Tourist attractions in Lincolnshire